Vyšná Polianka is a village and municipality in Bardejov District in the Prešov Region of north-east Slovakia.

History
In historical records the village was first mentioned in 1572

Geography
The municipality lies at an altitude of 450 metres and covers an area of 5.692 km².
It has a population of about 135 people.

References

External links
 
 
https://web.archive.org/web/20071217080336/http://www.statistics.sk/mosmis/eng/run.html 

Villages and municipalities in Bardejov District
Šariš